John Arthur Pregenzer (born August 2, 1932) is an American former professional baseball pitcher who appeared in parts of two Major League Baseball seasons (–64) for the San Francisco Giants.

Born in Burlington, Wisconsin, Pregenzer graduated from Antioch Community High School, in Illinois, and attended Illinois Wesleyan University. He was initially signed by the Pittsburgh Pirates before being acquired by the Giants as a minor leaguer during the 1960–61 offseason. That everyday baseball transaction would contribute to Pregenzer's fame during his brief Major League career. When Pregenzer made the Giants' roster at the outset of 1963, he came to the attention of Novella O'Hara, a baseball fan who wrote the "Question Man" column for the San Francisco Chronicle.

According to the journalist's 1997 obituary: "Miss O'Hara organized in 1963 the remarkable John Pregenzer Fan Club, after hearing that the Giants had acquired a rookie relief pitcher of that name for the waiver fee of $100. Miss O'Hara was fascinated with the idea that a baseball player could be acquired for such an affordable sum, and she asked the Giants if she could buy one, too. The fan club lasted longer than Pregenzer, who pitched in 19 games before being booted to the minors. Before Pregenzer's departure, however, Miss O'Hara had arranged for him to receive a baked pheasant testimonial dinner, a quality transistor radio and a scroll naming him honorary mayor of Fresno."  At its peak, the John Pregenzer Fan Club attracted 3,000 members.

In Pregenzer's 19 games for the Giants, he went undefeated in two decisions. In 27⅔ innings pitched, he allowed 29 hits and 19 bases on balls. He recorded 13 strikeouts and one save. He was a successful minor league pitcher; over eight campaigns, he won 66 games, losing 49 with an earned run average of 3.67.

Pregenzer now lives in Puyallup, Washington.

References

External links

1932 births
Living people
Baseball players from Wisconsin
Baseball players from Illinois
Fresno Giants players
Grand Forks Chiefs players
Idaho Falls Russets players
Illinois Wesleyan Titans baseball players
Major League Baseball pitchers
People from Burlington, Wisconsin
People from Antioch, Illinois
People from Puyallup, Washington
Pocatello Giants players
Salem Rebels players
San Francisco Giants players
Savannah Pirates players
Springfield Giants players
Tacoma Giants players